Chennai Blitz is a men's volleyball team from Chennai, Tamil Nadu playing in the Prime Volleyball League  in India. The team was founded in 2021 and owned by SPP Group.

Team

Current team

Administration and support staff

References 

Sport in Chennai
Sports clubs in India
Volleyball in India
Men's volleyball teams
Sports teams in Tamil Nadu